The Dallas Vigilantes were an Arena Football League team based in Dallas, Texas. Like its AFL predecessor, the Dallas Desperados, the Vigilantes played at the American Airlines Center. The Vigilantes and the Jacksonville Sharks began play in the 2010 season, the first after the league's restructuring. The franchise was owned by former Tampa Bay Storm owner Peter C. Kern and managed by original Buffalo Destroyers head coach Dave Whinham. The team's last head coach was former Desperados quarterback Clint Dolezel.

References
General
 

Arena Football League seasons by team
Dallas Vigilantes seasons
Dallas-related lists
Texas sports-related lists